Hans Berndtsson (born 5 March 1956) is a former Swedish football player.

During his club career, Berndtsson played for BK Häcken and Örgryte IS.

Berndtsson made five appearances for the Sweden national football team, between 1981 and 1982.

External links

1956 births
Swedish footballers
Sweden international footballers
BK Häcken players
Örgryte IS players
Association football defenders
Living people